The St. Joseph's Cathedral  also called Fort-Liberté Cathedral is a religious building belonging to the Catholic Church and is located in the city of Fort-Liberté (freedom Fort or Fòlibète in Haitian Creole), capital of the northeastern department (Département Nord-Est) in the Caribbean country of Haiti.

The cathedral follows the Roman or Latin Rite serves as the seat of the Bishop of the Diocese of Fort-Liberté (Latin: Dioecesis Castelli Libertatis). Work for its original construction was completed in 1703.

It is under the pastoral responsibility of the Bishop Quesnel Alphonse.

See also
List of cathedrals in Haiti
Roman Catholicism in Haiti
St. Joseph's Cathedral (disambiguation)

References

Roman Catholic cathedrals in Haiti
Fort-Liberté
Roman Catholic churches completed in 1703
1703 establishments in the French colonial empire
18th-century Roman Catholic church buildings in Haiti